Cambridge Nationals are a vocational qualification in the United Kingdom introduced by the OCR Examinations Board to replace the OCR Nationals. These are Level 1 and Level 2 qualifications for students aged 14 to 16  and are usually a two-year course. Students can progress to A Levels, apprenticeships or Level 3 vocational qualifications (National qualifications frameworks in the United Kingdom).

OCR is part of Cambridge University Press & Assessment.

Regulation 
In 2014 the UK government announced it would reform all vocational qualifications. [5] By 2021 it was ready to set out its plan for vocational qualifications in England [6] and redeveloped Level 1/Level 2 Cambridge Nationals qualifications were approved by OFQUAL for inclusion on the key stage 4 performance tables in England for 2024, to be taught from 2022. Ten redeveloped Cambridge Nationals qualifications were to be taught from 2022:

 Child Player
 Creative iMedia
 Enterprise and Marketing
 Engineering Design 
 Engineering Manufacture
 Engineering Programmable Systems
 Health and Social Care
 IT
 Sport Science
 Sport Studies

During the COVID-19 pandemic, OCR announced a series of adjustments it would make to support learners taking Cambridge Nationals.

Subjects 
The following subjects were offered up to 2022:

 Child Development Certificate Level 1/2
 Creative iMedia Award/Certificate Level 1/2
 Engineering Design Award/Certificate Level 1/2
 Engineering Manufacture Award/Certificate Level 1/2
 Enterprise and Marketing Certificate Level 1/2
 Health and Social Care Award/Certificate Level 1/2
 Information Technologies Certificate Level 1/2
 Principles in Engineering and Engineering Business Award/Certificate Level 1/2
 Sport Science Award/Certificate Level 1/2
 Sport Studies Award/Certificate Level 1/2
 Systems Control in Engineering Award/Certificate Level 1/2

References

OCR website

External links
Cambridge Nationals

Educational qualifications in the United Kingdom